I Am Other (stylized as i am OTHER) is a multimedia creative collective and record label created by Pharrell Williams that serves as an umbrella for all of his endeavors, including Billionaire Boys Club and ICECREAM apparel, textile company Bionic Yarn and a dedicated YouTube channel launched by the Grammy Award-winning artist, record producer, and fashion designer in 2012. The channel was launched on May 12, 2012, as part of YouTube's $100 million original channel initiative. The programming on the i am OTHER channel focuses on music, culture, fashion and the arts. Williams describes the channel as a "cultural movement dedicated to Thinkers, Innovators and Outcasts." The channel launched with original series such as Awkward Black Girl by Issa Rae, StereoTypes.

Historical programming
Awkward Black Girl – A comedy web series written, produced and starring Issa Rae, a Stanford graduate who created the scripted comedy to test her theory that "we’re all awkward".
Nardwuar – Music journalist Nardwuar hosts celebrity interviews with hip hop artists such as Drake, Jay-Z, Wiz Khalifa, Lil Wayne, Big Sean, ASAP Rocky, Snoop Dogg, and 2 Chainz, among others. 
OTHERS by Hypebeast  The show is produced in New York City and Hong Kong, and features tastemakers in various fields including fashion, film, food, and technology in conjunction with the popular style site Hypebeast.
Voice of Art – This documentary series from Nardwuar follows artists as they create awareness about social and political issues through their art. Features have included Migration is Beautiful with Favianna Rodriguez, and Graffiti Artists vs GMOs.
Club Chrissie  Chrissie Miller and special guests teach viewers DIY design tips, including nail art, sneaker, jewelry and t-shirt customization. 
Stereotypes – Ryan Hall hosts this web series in which he conducts man-on-the-street interviews in New York City. He speaks to the public about social issues and popular culture including racial stereotypes, class,  sexism, homophobia, politics, fashion, street style, and stop-and-frisk. 
Cloudy  This short by Nardwuar, Samuel Borkson and Arturo Sandoval III is an exploration into the clouds. Friends With You is part of Pharrell's i am OTHER brand.

References

External links
 Official i am OTHER website

Pharrell Williams
American record labels
Webcasters
YouTube channels
Entertainment companies based in New York City
American companies established in 2012
Record labels established in 2012
2012 establishments in New York City
YouTube channels launched in 2010